A double referendum was held in Egypt on 23 June 1956. The two issues were the candidacy of Gamal Abdel Nasser for the post of president, and a new constitution. Both were approved, with the official figures showing 99.9% in favour of Nasser's candidacy and 99.8% in favour of the constitution.

Background
Prior to the vote, Nasser had been consolidating power after ousting Muhammad Naguib and launching a massive crackdown against the Muslim Brotherhood in 1954. Other opposition forces had been previously outflanked by the Liberation Rally, the official political movement of the state set up by the Revolutionary Command Council following the abolition of political parties in 1953. The Liberation Rally's purpose was to acquire mass support for the RCC across the country and was reorganized into the National Union (NU) in 1956. The press also endorsed and urged support for the referendums. Another chief contributor to Nasser's growing legitimacy was his personal charisma. The NU chose a constitutional committee to pen the new constitution, although its members were picked by Nasser himself.

Results
The referendums were overwhelmingly supported by the electorate. According to government tallies, Nasser's bid for the presidency and the proposed constitution received almost unanimous approval by voters. Nasser ran uncontested, nominated by the new ruling party, the National Union. Historian Kirk J. Beatie wrote the government figures were likely fictitious, but it is also "impossible to know how accurate they were." Nasser successfully used the vote to promote himself as the protector of democracy, but according to author May Kassem, the vote "was utilized in an authoritarian manner" that only served to consecrate Nasser's rule.

Nasser for President

New constitution

References

Egypt
Referendum
Referendums in Egypt
Single-candidate elections
Constitutional referendums in Egypt
Egypt